Daniel Jaco van Heerden (born 26 January 1983) is a former South African rugby union referee that served on the Premier Panel of the South African Rugby Referees' Association between 2014 and 2017.

He retired from refereeing at the end of the 2017 season to concentrate on his career as a Supreme Court advocate.

Career

References

Living people
South African rugby union referees
1983 births
Super Rugby referees